3 is the third and final collaborative album by Stanley Clarke and George Duke, released in 1990 on Epic Records. The album peaked at No. 7 on the US Billboard Contemporary Jazz Albums chart.

Overview
Artists such as Gerald Alston, Rahsaan Patterson, West Coast hip hop group Above The Law and Philip Bailey, Phil Perry, Howard Hewett and Jeffrey Osborne appear on the album. Other artists like Jerry Hey, Michael Landau, George Bohanon, Brandon Fields, Wayne Shorter, Robert Brookins, Joe Henderson, Kirk Whalum, and drummer Dennis Chambers are also featured.

Singles 
The cover of Parliament-Funkadelic's "Mothership Connection" was released as a 12" single. George Clinton appeared in the music video.

"Lady" was released as a promotional and 7" single along with "Find Out Who You Are".

Track listing

Personnel 
Primary artists

 George Duke – keyboards (tracks: 1-6, 8-9, 11), synthesizer (tracks: 7, 10, 12), vocals (tracks: 2, 5, 9), lyrics (track 2), lead vocals (tracks: 4, 8), producer
 Stanley Clarke – bass (tracks: 1-9, 11-12), keyboards (track 3), vocals (track 5), lyrics (track 6), lead vocals (track 9), producer

Vocalists

 Rahsaan Patterson – lead vocals (track 3)
 Gerald Alston – lead vocals (track 6)
 Gregory Fernan Hutchison – lyrics & rap vocals (track 3)
 Philip Eugene Perry – vocals (tracks: 2, 5, 9), backing vocals (track 3)
 Carl Carwell – vocals (tracks: 4, 5, 9), backing vocals (track 3)
 Howard Hewett, Jr. – vocals (track 2)
 Jeffrey Linton Osborne – vocals (track 2)
 Roy Galloway – vocals (track 4), backing vocals (track 3)
 James Earl Gilstrap – vocals (track 4), backing vocals (track 3)
 Darrell Cox – vocals (track 5)
 Philip Irvin Bailey – vocals (track 5)
 Leon "Ndugu" Chancler – vocals (track 5)
 Larry Goodman – rap lyrics (track 3)
 Dennis Matkosky – lyrics (track 6)

Instrumentalists

 Dennis Milton Chambers – drums (tracks: 1-3, 5-6, 8-9, 11), hi-hats (track 4)
 Robert Brookins – keyboards (track 2)
 Brandon Fields – alto saxophone (track 5)
 Kirk Whalum – tenor saxophone (track 5)
 George Roland Bohanon, Jr. – trombone (track 5)
 Jerry Hey – trumpet (track 5)
 Michael Landau – guitar (track 6)
 Wayne Shorter – soprano saxophone (track 9)
 Joe Henderson – tenor saxophone (track 9)
 Rayford Griffin – drums (track 11)
 Buell Neidlinger – double bass
 Dorothy Remsen – harp
 Earl Madison – cello
 Steve Erdody – cello
 Ronald Cooper – cello
 Douglas L. Davis – cello
 Dan Neufeld – viola
 Miriam Meyer – viola
 Marilyn Baker – viola
 Carole Mukogawa – viola
 Mihail Zinovyev – viola
 Samuel Boghossian – viola
 Bill Hybel – violin
 Neal Laite – violin
 Murray Adler – violin
 Israel Baker – violin
 Endre Granat – violin
 Brenton Banks – violin
 Reginald Hill – violin
 Michael Ferril – violin
 Mitchell Newman – violin
 Armen Garabedian – violin
 Claudia Parducci – violin
 Anatoly Rosinsky – violin
 Alexander Horvath – violin
 Franklyn D'Antonio – violin
 George Del Barrio – conducting

Technicals
 Erik Zobler – mixing & recording
 Mick Guzauski – mixing (tracks: 3, 6)
 Kevin Fisher – additional engineering
 Steve Sykes – additional engineering
 Dan Humann – additional engineering
 David Rideau – additional engineering
 Steve Holroyd – additional engineering
 Bernie Grundman – mastering
 Linda McClary – production coordinator

Additional
 Chris Cuffaro – photography
 Mary Maurer – art direction
 Nancy Donald – art direction

Chart history

References 

1990 albums
George Duke albums
Stanley Clarke albums
Epic Records albums
Collaborative albums
Albums produced by George Duke
Albums produced by Stanley Clarke